The  Asian Baseball Championship was the tenth continental tournament held by the Baseball Federation of Asia. The tournament was held in Manila, Philippines for the fourth time. The tournament was won by Japan; their seventh Asian Championship. Defending champions South Korea (2nd), Taiwan (3rd), Philippines (4th) and Australia (5th) were the other participants.

References

Bibliography 
 

Asian Baseball Championship
International baseball competitions hosted by the Philippines
1973 in Philippine sport
Sports competitions in Manila
20th century in Manila